Joseph Henry Douglass (July 3, 1871 – December 7, 1935) was a groundbreaking African-American concert violinist, the son of Charles Remond Douglass and Mary Elizabeth Murphy, and grandson of abolitionist Frederick Douglass.

Early life and influence
During the time following the Civil War, many African-American musicians began to break into the art music genre. Joseph Douglass, a concert violinist, was one of the first African-American performers to be nationally and internationally renowned. His influence came at an early age from his father and grandfather, famous abolitionist Frederick Douglass, who were both amateur violin players. He studied violin at Boston Conservatory.

First big break
Douglass received his first big break as a concert violinist at the age of 22 when he performed at the World's Columbian Exposition, also known as the Chicago World's Fair. On August 25, 1893, performers joined together to celebrate Colored American Day (which Frederick Douglass helped plan). Included in the celebrations were readings of Paul Laurence Dunbar's poetry, performances by Sidney Woodward and Deseria Plato. Joseph Douglass also performed at Colored American Day, garnering him a large audience for his talents.

Later life

After his performance at the World's Columbian Exposition, he was very well known. Douglass is credited as the first Black violinist to make transcontinental tours. In the 1890s, he was lauded by the black press as "the most talented violinist of the race". Douglass toured extensively for three decades, performing in every Black educational institution and America and a significant number of churches as well. Douglass was also the first Black violinist to make recordings for the Victor Talking Machine Company, in 1914, but they were never released. On top of his performance career, Douglass was an educator and conductor, too. He had tenured positions at Howard University and the Colored Music Settlement School in New York throughout his life. He had many students including a young Clarence Cameron White.

Personal life
Douglass married Fannie Howard Douglass. Fannie was a musician as well, often accompanying Joseph's performances on the piano. He and Fannie had two children: Blanche and Frederick III.

References

External links 

 Joseph H. Douglass photographs and ephemera, 1894-1936, Houghton Library, Harvard University.

1871 births
1935 deaths
Joseph Douglass
American classical violinists
Male classical violinists
American music educators